Aryans College of Law is a private law school situated beside Chandigarh-Patiala National Highway 7 (India) at Rajpura, Patiala in the Indian state of Punjab. It offers undergraduate three-year law courses and five-year Integrated B.A. courses. LL.B. courses are approved by the Bar Council of India (BCI) in New Delhi and affiliated to Punjabi University.

History
Aryans College of Law was established in 2016 by the Aryans Group of Colleges of Chandigarh. In 2019, the College became part of the Universities and Colleges of Legal Studies to use Common Law Admission Test (CLAT) scores for the admission in Legal studies. This is the only College in Punjab to use CLAT Score.

References

Law schools in Punjab, India
Educational institutions established in 2016
2016 establishments in Punjab, India
Education in Patiala